Porayar was one of the 234 constituencies in the Tamil Nadu Legislative Assembly of Tamil Nadu a southern state of India. It was in Nagapattinam district.

Madras state

Election results

1962

References

External links
 

Nagapattinam district
Former assembly constituencies of Tamil Nadu